Sverdrup is a unit of volume flux.

Sverdrup may also refer to:

Surname 
 Einar Sverdrup (1895–1942), a Norwegian mining engineer and businessman
 Erling Sverdrup (1917–1994), Norwegian statistician
 Georg Sverdrup (1770–1850), founder of the first Norwegian university library
 Georg Sverdrup (1848–1907), President of Augsburg Seminary
 George Sverdrup, son of Georg, also president of Augsburg Seminary from 1911 to 1937
 George Sverdrup, technology manager of the National Renewable Energy Laboratory
 Harald Ulrik Sverdrup (politician) (1813–1891), Norwegian priest and politician
 Harald Sverdrup (oceanographer) (1888–1957), Norwegian oceanographer grandson of the previous one
 Harald Sverdrup (writer) (1923–1992), Norwegian writer and poet
 Johan Sverdrup (1816–1892), prime minister of Norway
 Leif J. Sverdrup (1898–1976), a Norwegian-American civil engineer
 Otto Neumann Sverdrup (1854–1930), Norwegian explorer
 Tone Sverdrup (born 1951), Norwegian jurist

Places 
 Sverdrup Pass, a pass on Ellesmere Island, Nunavut, Canada
 Sverdrup Islands, Arctic islands
 Sverdrup Island (Kara Sea), another Arctic island
 Sverdrup (crater), a lunar crater near the Moon's south pole
 Sverdrup Township, Minnesota
 Johan Sverdrup oil field, often abbreviated as Sverdrup

Other uses 
 Sverdrup balance, an oceanographic theory